The following events occurred in March 1925:

March 1, 1925 (Sunday)
France reported the conclusions of a military committee led by Marshal Ferdinand Foch which found that Germany was gravely violating the disarmament provisions laid down in the Treaty of Versailles. 
The film The Mad Whirl, starring May McAvoy and Jack Mulhall, was released.
The Club Cerro Corá of football was founded in Paraguay.

March 2, 1925 (Monday)
Lauri Kristian Relander became the 2nd President of Finland.
New kinds of Austrian schillings were introduced. 
Died: Luigj Gurakuqi, 46, Albanian writer and politician (assassinated)

March 3, 1925 (Tuesday)
The 4th government of Turkey began.
United States Congress authorized the Mount Rushmore Memorial Commission.
Born: Joe Sentieri, singer and actor, in Genoa, Italy (d. 2007)

March 4, 1925 (Wednesday)
The second inauguration of Calvin Coolidge took place in Washington, D.C. It was the first U.S. presidential inauguration to be nationally broadcast on radio.
Born: Paul Mauriat, orchestra leader, in Marseille, France (d. 2006)
Died: Moritz Moszkowski, 70, Polish composer; James Ward, 82, English philosopher and psychologist; John Montgomery Ward, 65, American baseball player

March 5, 1925 (Thursday)
Charles Lindbergh was in a serious flight accident during his pilot training with the U.S. Army Air Service when his SE-5 collided in midair with that of another cadet. Lindbergh parachuted to safety and thus joined the Caterpillar Club.
Frank B. Kellogg became United States Secretary of State.
Died: Clément Ader, 84, French Army captain and aviation pioneer

March 6, 1925 (Friday)
The Eupen-Malmedy region was transferred from Germany to Belgium, as per the Treaty of Versailles.
Pionerskaya Pravda was founded in Moscow.
Miners went on strike in the Canadian province of Nova Scotia.

March 7, 1925 (Saturday)
The Social Democratic Party of Germany voted to nominate Otto Braun as their candidate in the March 29 presidential election.
Born: Rene Gagnon, United States Marine and flag raiser on Iwo Jima, in Manchester, New Hampshire (d. 1979)
Died: Georgy Lvov, 63, Prime Minister of Russia

March 8, 1925 (Sunday)
The Chicago Department of Public Health announced that the present crossword puzzle fad caused no ill health effects from headaches or eye strain, as had previously been feared.

March 9, 1925 (Monday)
Bavaria imposed a two-year ban on Adolf Hitler from public speaking, limiting him to addressing only private, closed meetings. The government was nervous at the large crowds Hitler was drawing.
Died: Willard Metcalf, 66, American artist

March 10, 1925 (Tuesday)
A young member of the Nazi Party, Otto Rothstock, entered the office of Austrian writer Hugo Bettauer and shot him five times at point blank range. Rothstock was angered by Bettauer's novel The City Without Jews which satirized antisemitism. Bettauer died of his wounds on March 25.
Greek professional association  football club, Olympiacos F.C. was founded in Athens.
Died: Myer Prinstein, 46, American track athlete

March 11, 1925 (Wednesday)
The League of Nations shelved all action on limiting the private manufacture of arms. The move was made ahead of the conference on limitation of arms trafficking to open on May 4, on the grounds that the United States would oppose such action on the grounds of such business being too lucrative.

March 12, 1925 (Thursday)
The British government decided to reject the Geneva Protocol.
The SS President Arthur (formerly the ) departed New York en route to Palestine on the maiden voyage of the American Palestine Line.
Born: Leo Esaki, physicist and Nobel Prize laureate, in Osaka, Japan
Died:  Gergely Luthár, 84, Hungarian Slovene writer; Sun Yat-sen, 58, Chinese revolutionary and founder of the first Republic of China

March 13, 1925 (Friday)
In Halle, Germany, six Communists were killed and 30 wounded when police broke up a communist demonstration. 
Soviet newspaper Komsomolskaya Pravda was founded.
Died: Lucille Ricksen, 14, American film actress (tuberculosis)

March 14, 1925 (Saturday)
The Council of the League of Nations expressed hope that Germany would apply to join in September. 
France's Senate Finance Committee voted to maintain its embassy at the Vatican, over the wishes of Prime Minister Édouard Herriot. 
Died: Walter Camp, 65, American football coach

March 15, 1925 (Sunday)
The films Riders of the Purple Sage and Heart of a Siren were released.
The American state of New Mexico adapted its distinctive yellow flag.
Born: Andy McCall, footballer, in Hamilton, Scotland (d. 2014)

March 16, 1925 (Monday)
 At 22:42 local time a 7.0 earthquake shakes the Chinese province of Yunnan killing 5,000 people.
A 5,000-mile high speed communications cable between the United States and Italy was officially activated by envoy to the United States Giacomo De Martino. 
The horror-comedy film The Monster, starring Lon Chaney, was released.
Born: Cornell Borchers, film actress, in Silute, Lithuania (d. 2014); Luis E. Miramontes, chemist, in Tepic, Mexico (d. 2004)

March 17, 1925 (Tuesday)
Czechoslovakian Foreign Minister Edvard Beneš proposed a "United States of Europe", divided into two groups of roughly equal power, to secure peace. England, France, Belgium, Germany and Spain could make up the western bloc, while Poland, Romania, Czechoslovakia, Austria and others could make up the eastern bloc.
An explosion at a coal mine near Barrackville, West Virginia killed 33.

March 18, 1925 (Wednesday)
The Tri-State Tornado, the deadliest in U.S. history, struck parts of Missouri, Illinois and Indiana.
Fire in northeastern Tokyo destroyed 3,000 buildings.
France and Switzerland reached an agreement regarding free zones in their shared border region.
Two floors of Madame Tussauds wax museum in London were destroyed by fire.
Born: Don Paul, American football player, in Fresno, California (d. 2014)

March 19, 1925 (Thursday)
U.S. President Calvin Coolidge invited the nations of the world to participate in the Sesquicentennial Exposition to be held in Philadelphia in 1926. 
The classic jazz tune "Sweet Georgia Brown" was first recorded by bandleader Ben Bernie.
The British government announced that it was proceeding with the development of a major naval base at Singapore.

March 20, 1925 (Friday)
Arturo Alessandri returned from exile to retake office as president of Chile, thus ending the January Junta.
The documentary film Grass, following the Bakhtiari tribe of Persia, was released.
Died: George Curzon, 1st Marquess Curzon of Kedleston, 66, Viceroy of India

March 21, 1925 (Saturday)
The state of Tennessee enacted the Butler Act, prohibiting school teachers from denying the Biblical account of man's origin.
The first performance of the Maurice Ravel opera ballet L'enfant et les sortilèges was conducted in Monte Carlo.
Born: Peter Brook, British theatre director, in Chiswick (d. 2022)

March 22, 1925 (Sunday)
The first Japanese radio program was transmitted in Tokyo.
Women's tuxedos were reported as the newest fashion rage in Paris.
40-year-old Lewis S. Thompson of Denver, Colorado, fell  to his death from the South Rim of the Grand Canyon while posing for a photo.
Born: Gerard Hoffnung, artist and musician, in Berlin (d. 1959)

March 23, 1925 (Monday)
In Rome, Benito Mussolini made his first public appearance in over a month when he briefly spoke at a celebration commemorating the sixth anniversary of the Fasci Italiani da Combattimento. There had been much speculation as to the state of his health during his long absence.
Parliamentary elections were held in Egypt. The Wafd Party lost its majority to a collection of other parties and independents.
Born: David Watkin, cinematographer, in Margate, England (d. 2008)

March 24, 1925 (Tuesday)
The two-act operetta and radio opera The Red Pen was first broadcast.
Born: Quazi Nuruzzaman, Bangladeshi guerrilla commander (d. 2011)

March 25, 1925 (Wednesday)
Scottish inventor John Logie Baird  publicly demonstrated the transmission of moving silhouette pictures at the London department store Selfridges.
Born: Flannery O'Connor, writer, in Savannah, Georgia (d. 1964)
Died: Hugo Bettauer, 52, Austrian writer and journalist (shot on March 10)

March 26, 1925 (Thursday)
A fistfight broke out in the Italian Chamber of Deputies. Upon Benito Mussolini's return to the Chamber after an absence of 40 days, Fascists cheered and sang "Giovinezza", while the Communists countered with "The Internationale". Fascists rushed the Communist benches and punches were exchanged until the Communists left the Chamber and order was restored.
Germany announced that holders of German war bonds would receive a refund of 5 percent of their original investment. Winners of a lottery would receive a refund of up to 25 percent.
The British armed merchant cruiser  was launched.
Born: Pierre Boulez, composer, in Montbrison, Loire, France (d. 2016)

March 27, 1925 (Friday)
Double Chase won the 84th Grand National horse race at Aintree Racecourse near Liverpool, England.
James "Red" Herring won boxing's World Junior Welterweight Title in a controversial decision over Pinky Mitchell.

March 28, 1925 (Saturday)
The remains of U.S. Admiral George Dewey were disinterred from Arlington National Cemetery and moved to the Washington National Cathedral, next to the tomb of Woodrow Wilson.
The University of Cambridge won the 77th annual Boat Race.
Died: Henry Rawlinson, 1st Baron Rawlinson, 61, British general

March 29, 1925 (Sunday)
The German presidential election was held to choose a successor to Friedrich Ebert, who died in office February 28. Karl Jarres came in first with 38.8% of the vote, but because no candidate won a majority a run-off election was set for April 26.
Japan passed a suffrage bill expanding voting rights to 4 million citizens who were previously barred from voting on account of their dependence on public or private assistance for their livelihood.
Born: Bobby Hutchins, child film actor (Our Gang), in Tacoma, Washington (d. 1945)

March 30, 1925 (Monday)
The Victoria Cougars defeated the Montreal Canadiens, 6 to 1, to win the Stanley Cup of ice hockey, three games to one. The Cougars were the last non-NHL team to win the Cup.
Explorer Donald Baxter MacMillan urged U.S. President Coolidge to send ships into the Arctic in search of undiscovered lands to claim for the United States.
Died: Rudolf Steiner, 64, Austrian philosopher

March 31, 1925 (Tuesday)
67 soldiers of the Reichswehr were reported drowned when a pontoon bridge over the Weser river near Minden collapsed. Later reporting alleged that the casualties were over 200 and the German military was conducting experiments with a new river-crossing system.
The Philadelphia Daily News began publication.

References

1925
1925-03
1925-03